Debra Marcus is a British-born Israeli sprinter. 

Debra (Devora) Marcus won a gold medal in the 1966 Bangkok Asian Games in the 200 metres. She was one of a series of athletes who won medals at this event. Upon their return to Israel, the athletes received a warm reception from then Prime Minister Levi Eshkol.

See also
Sports in Israel
Women of Israel

References 

Israeli female sprinters
Asian Games gold medalists for Israel
Asian Games bronze medalists for Israel
Asian Games medalists in athletics (track and field)
Athletes (track and field) at the 1966 Asian Games
Medalists at the 1966 Asian Games